Joe Public is an American new jack swing group from Buffalo, New York. The group consists of lead singer and bass guitarist Kevin Scott, keyboardist and guitarist Jake Carter, percussionist and drummer Dwight "Mr. Dew" Wyatt and lead guitarist Joe "J.R." Sayles. They are best known for their hit single "Live and Learn," which reached #4 on the Billboard Hot 100 chart in 1992.

Musical work
Joe Public evolved from the group Atension, signed to Island Records in 1989. Their debut album on Columbia Records, Joe Public, contained their hit single "Live and Learn" which became their only top-40 hit peaking at #4 on the Billboard Hot 100. Their follow-up single, "I Miss You" reached #55 on the same chart. Joe Public was the first-ever R&B group to perform on MTV's Unplugged series where they were also the back up band for Boyz II Men and Shanice. Joe Public was also the back up band for Kris Kross on The Arsenio Hall Show, which featured Jermaine Dupri's first national TV appearance.

They hosted the "NBA Jams Music Video," a VHS promotional release for the video game NBA Jam: Tournament Edition that contained music videos intercut with professional basketball highlight footage. The video for "Live and Learn" is contained on it, as well as improvised live footage between video segments.

They later released their second studio album Easy Come, Easy Go in 1994, also under Columbia Records.

They continued to act as songwriters, writing the song "Keep It Comin'" for fellow New Jack Swing artist Keith Sweat in 1991 as well as songs for Tyrese.

Discography

Albums
1992: Joe Public #111 U.S., #23 U.S. R&B
1994: Easy Come, Easy Go

Singles

References

External links

American contemporary R&B musical groups
Musical groups from Buffalo, New York
Musical groups established in 1989
New jack swing music groups